Susan Thompson Buffett (June 15, 1932 – July 29, 2004) was an American activist for the causes of civil rights, abortion rights and birth control, and the first wife of investor Warren Buffett. She was a director of Berkshire Hathaway, owning 2.2 percent of the company worth about $3 billion at the time of her death, making her the 153rd richest person in the world. She was president of the Buffett Foundation, which has contributed millions of dollars to educational groups, medical research, family planning groups and other charities.

Biography
Susan was born in Omaha, Nebraska, and graduated from Omaha Central High School. Her father, William Hertzog Thompson, was a minister, psychologist, dean at the University of Nebraska-Omaha, and one-time campaign manager for Howard Buffett.

Though her parents and Warren's knew one another, they met at Northwestern University, via Susan's roommate Roberta Buffett, Warren's sister.

Susan and Warren married in 1952 at the Dundee Presbyterian Church in Omaha. They had three children together: Susan (born July 30, 1953), Howard (born December 16, 1954), and Peter (born May 4, 1958).

She occasionally performed hit classics from the early 1970's cabaret singer and, in 1977, had a one-night performance at an Omaha theater. Encouraged by songwriter/musician Neil Sedaka to pursue a singing career, she left her husband and moved to San Francisco.  She started out living in a small apartment in Gramercy Tower on Nob Hill.  Later she moved into a large condominium on Broadway near Scott Street in Pacific Heights with views of the Golden Gate Bridge and Alcatraz. She remained married and on good terms with her husband, vacationing together with him and spending time assisting charitable groups.  She performed in New York and released several CDs. According to Roger Lowenstein's 1995 Random House biography, Buffett: The Making of an American Capitalist, while Warren had encouraged Susan to pursue her career in music, he was heartbroken by her move.

In 1978, Susan introduced her husband to Astrid Menks, who moved in with Warren in their Omaha home, and married him after Susan's death.

The Buffetts never divorced and even attended public functions as husband and wife though they hadn't lived together for more than half of their marriage. The Buffetts even signed Christmas cards Warren, Susan, and Astrid and were often seen together as a trio.

Oral cancer and death
In October 2003, Susan was diagnosed with oral cancer; she underwent surgery, radiation therapy and facial reconstruction. Warren flew out from Omaha to be with her every weekend during her recovery and the couple would later contribute $6 million to five California doctors for the study of oral cancer.  She had recovered enough to attend the annual shareholders' meeting of Berkshire Hathaway in May 2004, leading a singalong at the Borsheim's reception.

Susan died at the age of 72 after suffering a cerebral hemorrhage during the summer of 2004 in Cody, Wyoming. Bono performed "Forever Young" and "All I Want Is You" at her funeral.  Warren was so grief-stricken that he did not attend.  She left approximately $50 million to her children's charity while each of her children received $10 million and each grandchild received $100,000.  She also left a number of friends and employees substantial sums, including $8 million to John McCabe and $1 million to Ron Parks.  Nearly all of her Berkshire Hathaway shares, valued at nearly $3 billion at the time, were left to a foundation that would later bear her name.

References

External links
 Susan Buffett remembered and interviewed by Charlie Rose August 26, 2004

1932 births
2004 deaths
American activists
American nonprofit executives
American philanthropists
Directors of Berkshire Hathaway
Susan Buffett
Businesspeople from Omaha, Nebraska
Cabaret singers
Deaths from oral cancer
Musicians from Omaha, Nebraska
Northwestern University alumni
Women nonprofit executives
20th-century American singers
20th-century American women singers
Omaha Central High School alumni